Thrissur is the Cultural Capital of Kerala and a major financial and commercial hub in South India. Thrissur has traditionally been a centre of learning. With the decline of Buddhism and Jainism, Thrissur became an important centre of Sanskrit learning. Thrissur is also fast becoming the educational capital of Kerala too.

With the existence of four medical colleges, Kerala Agricultural University, about a dozen engineering colleges,College of Agriculture, ayurveda college, veterinary college, business schools, well known arts and science colleges, good residential schools makes Thrissur a scholar's city. Thrissur is also the centre of coaching classes for the aspiring doctors and engineers of the future. These coaching classes prepare students for various all-India entrance examinations. Their presence gives Thrissur a distinct aura of being an educational centre of Kerala.

Universities
 Kerala Agricultural University, Thrissur
 Kerala University of Health Sciences, Thrissur
 Kerala Institute of Local Administration (KILA), Thrissur
 Kerala Kalamandalam, Thrissur
 Rashtreeya Sanskrit Samsthan, Puranattukara, Thrissur

Degree colleges

Professional Degree College
College of Agriculture Vellanikkara, Mannuthy, കേരള കാർഷിക സർവ്വകലാശാല.

Thrissur City
IIBMR - International Institute of Business management & Research, Thrissur
St. Aloysius College, Thrissur
 Sri C. Achutha Menon Government College, Kuttanellur
 Vimala College, Thrissur
 St. Mary's College, Thrissur
 St. Thomas College, Thrissur
 Sree Kerala Varma college, Thrissur
 College of Fine Arts, Thrissur
 Paramekkavu arts and science college, Thrissur
 Government arts and science college, Ollur, Thrissur
 Government Rama Varma memorial college for music and performing arts, Thrissur
 Riju & PSK Classes, Thrissur

Thrissur Rural

 Christ College, Irinjalakuda
 St. Joseph's College, Irinjalakuda
 Little Flower College, Guruvayur
 Sacred Heart College Chalakudy
 Carmel College, Mala
 Aims College, Vatanappally
 Prajyoti Niketan College, Pudukad 
 Naipunnya Institute of Management and Information Technology, Koratty
 Sri Vyasa NSS College, Wadakkanchery
 Sree Gokulam College of Arts & Science for Women, Pazhuvil West
 Sree Narayana College, Nattika
 Sree Narayana Guru College Of Advanced Studies, Nattika
 Sree Krishna College, Guruvayur
 Panampilly Memorial Government College, Chalakkudi
 Sahrdaya College of Advanced Studies, Kodakara
 Kunjikuttan Thampuran Memorial Government College, Kodungallur (KKTM Government College)
 MES Asmabi College, Kodungallur
 Vivekananda College, Kunnamkulam
 Tharananellore Arts and Science College, Irinjalakkuda
 Ansar Women's College, Perumpilavu
 Govt. Arts and Science College, Chelakkara
 Mother Arts & Science College, Peruvalloor
 A.C. Kunhimon Haji Memorial I.C.A College, Thozhiyur
 Sree Narayana Guru College of Advanced Studies, Vazhukkumpara
 IIBMR, Indian Institute of Business Management and Research, Thrissur

Medical colleges
 Government Medical College, Thrissur
 Jubilee Mission Medical College and Research Institute, Thrissur
 Amala Institute of Medical Sciences, Amala Nagar, Thrissur

Engineering colleges
 Government Engineering College, Thrissur (RAMAVARMA PURAM)

Thrissur Rural
 Vidya Academy of Science and Technology
 Sahrdaya College of Engineering and Technology
 Jyothi Engineering College, Cheruthuruthy, Thrissur 
 Royal College of Engineering & Technology, Thrissur
 IES College of Engineering, Chittilappilly, Thrissur
 IES College of Architecture, Chittilappilly, Thrissur
 Malabar College of Engineering and Technology, Thrissur
 MET's School of Engineering, Mala, Thrissur
 Sree Eranakulathappan College of Engineering and Management, Thrissur
 Southern College of Engineering & Technology, Chalakudy, Thrissur
 Axis College of Engineering & Technology, Kodakara, Thrissur
 Thejus Engineering College, Erumappetty, Thrissur
 Holy Grace Academy of Engineering, Mala, Thrissur
 Universal Engineering College, Irinjalakuda, Thrissur
 Christ College of Engineering, Irinjalakuda
 Focus Institute of Science and Technology, Poomala, Thrissur
 Nehru College of Engineering and Research Centre, Pambady
 Nirmala College of Engineering, Chalakudy, Thrissur

MBA colleges

MBA/MCA Colleges in Thrissur City
 IIBMR Indian Institute of Business Management and Research, Thrissur 
 SMS Thiroor, University of Calicut
 Elijah Institute of Management Studies, Rama Varma Puram Thrissur city
 John Mathai Centre, Aranattukara Thrissur city
 Don Bosco College, Mannuthy, Thrissur city

MBA/MCA Colleges in Thrissur Rural
 Aims College, Vatanappally, Thrissur
 Naipunya Business School, Koratty, Thrissur
Prajyothi Niketan College Pudukkad, Thrissur
 Holy Grace Academy of Management Studies, Mala, Thrissur
 West Fort Academy for Higher Education, Pottore, Thrissur (IMT)
 Sahrdaya Institute of Management Studies, Kodakara, Thrissur
 Nirmala College of Management Studies, Chalakudy, Thrissur
 Nehru College of Engineering and Research Centre, Pambady

Media college
 Nirmala College of Arts and Science, Chalakudy, Thrissur
 Chethana college of Media and Performing Arts, Chiyyaram, Thrissur city
 Divine Institute of Media Science, Muringoor, Thrissur
 Tiga Vision Institute of Media Studies, Poothole, Thrissur

 College of Applied Sciences (IHRD)
 College of Applied Science, Chelakkara, Thrissur
 College of Applied Science, Valapad, Thrissur
 College of Applied Science IHRD Polytechnic, Kallettumkara, Thrissur

Arabic college
 Thaqwa Aflal-ul-ulama Arabic College, Andathode, Thrissur

Polytechnic colleges

Thrissur
 Maharaja’s Technological Institute, Thrissur
 Women's Polytechnic College, Thrissur

Thrissur Rural
 Aims College, Vatanappally
 Sree Rama Government Polytechnic College, Thriprayar
 Thiagarajar Polytechnic College, Alagappanagar
 Government Polytechnic College, Koratty
 Government Polytechnic College, Kunnamkulam
 Government Polytechnic College, Chelakkara
 Model Polytechnic, Kallettumkara
 Christ Technical Academy, Irinjalakuda
 Nirmala Institute of Technology, Chalakudy, Thrissur

Nursing colleges
 West Fort College of Nursing West Fort Hospital, Thrissurcity
 Mother College of Nursing, Pullazhi, Thrissurcity
 Aswini College of Nursing, Nadathara, Thrissurcity
 Jubilee Mission College of Nursing, Thrissur city
 Amala College of Nursing, Amala Nagar, Thrissur
 Government College of Nursing, Thrissur 
 Ansar Nursing college, Perumpilavu, Thrissur

Training colleges
 Aims College, Vatanappally
 Government B.Ed Centre, Ollur
 Government B.Ed Centre, Thalikkulam
 JPE Training College, Koorkenchery, Thrissur
 Navajyothi College of Teacher Education for Women, Thrissur
 Sree Vivekananda Teacher Education Centre
 Ideal Educational Society Training College, Thrissur
 Institute of Advanced Study in Education, Thrissur (Govt.)

Ayurveda colleges

Thrissur City
 Vaidyaratnam Ayurveda College, Ollur, Thrissur

Thrissur Rural
 Poomully Neelakandan Namboothiripad Memorial Ayurveda Medical College, Cheruthuruthy, Thrissur

Dental colleges
 PSM College of Dental Science and Research, Akkikkavu, Thrissur
 Government Dental College, Thrissur

Law colleges

Thrissur City
 Government Law College, Thrissur (Ayyanthole)
 AIM Law College, Poyya, Mala

College of pharmacy
 St James College of Pharmaceutical Sciences, Chalakkudi
 Thriveni Institute of Pharmacy, Kechery, Thrissur
 ELIMS College of Pharmacy, Villadam, Ramavarmapuram P O, Thrissur
 Nirmala College of Health Science, Chalakudy, Thrissur
 WEST FORT COLLEGE OF PHARMACY, POTTORE, THRISSUR

College of forestry
 College of Forestry, Vellanikkara, Thrissur

College of dairy science
 College of Dairy Science and Technology, Mannuthy

College of Agriculture
 College of Agriculture, Vellanikkara

Colleges of veterinary education
 College of Veterinary and Animal Sciences, Mannuthy

Research Institutes and academies
 Kerala Forest Research Institute, Thrissur city
 Prajyoti Niketan International Centre for Research, Training and Service, Pudukad 
 Excise Academy and Research Centre, Thrissur city
 Centre of Science and Technology for Rural Development, Thrissur city
 National Research Institute for Panchakarma, Cheruthuruthy, Thrissur
 Banana Research station, Kannara
 Agronomic Research station, Chalakkudy
 Cashew Research station, Madakkathara
 Agricultural Research station, Mannuthy
 Plant Propagation & Nursery Management Unit, Vellanikkara
 Food Craft Institute, Poothole, Thrissur
 School of Drama, Thrissur
 National Bureau of Plant Genetic Resources (ICAR), Regional Station, Thrissur
 Regional Institute for Physical Medicine and Rehabilitation, Kallettumkara, Thrissur
 Centre for Materials for Electronics Technology (C-MET) Thrissur

References

 
Thrissur
Colleges in India